The 2012 Farmers Classic Doubles was a men's tennis tournament played on outdoor hard courts in Los Angeles, California.

Xavier Malisse, with fellow countryman Ruben Bemelmans, defended his title, defeating Jamie Delgado and Ken Skupski 7–6(7–5), 4–6, [10–7] in the final. Mark Knowles and  Malisse were the defending champions but Knowles decided not to participate.

Seeds

Draw

Draw

References

External links
 Main draw

Farmers Classic - Doubles
2012 Doubles